Aethra or AETHRA may refer to:
 Aethra (Greek mythology), a number of different characters in Greek mythology
 Aethra (crab), a genus of crabs in the family Aethridae
 AETHRA Componentes Automotivos, a Brazilian auto testing company
 Aethra, a fictional moon in the Colony Wars franchise
 132 Aethra, an M-type main-belt asteroid
 The Aethra Chronicles, A 1994 MS-DOS Computer Role Playing Game, produced by Michael Lawrence